Nurul Islam Faruqi, was a Bangladeshi Islamic scholar, businessman, politician and preacher. He was killed by unknown assailants in 2014.

Background
He used to anchor programs titled Shantir Pothe and Kafela on Channel I, Haq Kotha on MyTv.  and served as the Khatib of Supreme Court mosque. Politically, he was a presidium member and the international affairs secretary of Ahle Sunnat Wal Jamaat and served as the presidium member of Bangladesh Islami Front, a platform of several Islamist groups.

Apart from this he owned a Hajj agency, Faruque Tours and Travels.

Death
On 27 August 2014, Farooqi was killed by 8-10 unknown assailants in his Rajabazar office. Earlier a woman, mystery who had telephoned him repeatedly in order to visit him at his home. Witnesses said the woman, who was in her forties, was nervous and behaved oddly during her two-hour stay at Faooqi’s house. His family claimed that several youth had come to the house to talk over Hajj and killed him. According to a local imam, two youths came to his house at around 8:30 PM, and 6-7 armed youths entered the house and demanded all the money he had. When Farooqi said he had around 100,000 taka at home, they said this money would not do for so many of them. They tied his hands and legs with clothes in his bedroom and slaughtered him before leaving. His family was left unharmed.

Reactions
Farooqi's wife claimed that if the mystery woman was arrested, the culprits would be caught. His son Ahmed Reza Farooqi, read a written statement saying: "My father was a believer of 'Sunni' ideology. He had received death threats on mobile phone and facebook from those who opposed his ideology. Extremists or Khareji-Wahabi Ahle Hadith killed him. It was a planned murder." He also played down any role of his personal life or business relations over the matter.

Faruqi's murder triggered protests by several Islamic groups, who called a nationwide strike to demand the culprits' swift arrest.

Mosaheb Uddin Bakhtiar, presidium member of Ahle Sunnat Organization blamed "the followers of Wahabi and Moududi" for the murder. "It was a planned murder as Maulana Faruqi was a supporter of Sunni (sic) and he was publishing truth through the media," he added.

Members of his organization, Ahle Sunnat protested the killing of their leader Nurul Islam Faruqi, in Chittagong by blocking the city's Muradpur intersection.

In August, 2014, Bangladesh Islami Chattra Sena’s chief Muhammad Nurul Haq Chisty made the announcement at a press meet that half-day strike across Bangladesh would be observed demanding arrest and trial of the killers of party leader Nurul Islam Farooqi.
Bangladesh Islami Chhatra Sena formed a human chain on the Dhaka-Sylhet Highway's Ashuganj area on demanding punishment for the killers. World Sunni Movement also organized several peaceful human chain under the direction of Syed Imam Hayat demanding justice for the real killers.

Arrests
On 29 August, police detained the "mystery woman" named Mahbuba from Narayanganj's Rupganj area for her alleged involvement with the murder.

Personal life
Farooqi had two wives. His second wife Lubna Islam lived with him at the Razabazar home, while his first wife and her children lived in the Malibagh area of Dhaka.

References

Bengali Muslim scholars of Islam
Sunni Muslim scholars of Islam
Bangladeshi Sunni Muslim scholars of Islam
Islamic education in Bangladesh
Bangladeshi Islamists
2014 deaths
People murdered in Dhaka
Bangladeshi murder victims
21st-century Bengalis